Sings is the first album to be released by Emi Tawata under label Techesko The CD contains several songs she had released before on an EP or a single. The songs "Naturally" and "Into You" have a complete new arrangement thanks to the Soul Infinity band. Also "Can't Reach" has been remixed and has new vocals. The album includes a cover of "Joy To The World" which was used in the Suzuki Splash commercial. The CD+DVD version is limited to 10,000 copies. The DVD track list was released on 1 October. The name of the DVD is Sings: Soulgraphy2006-2009 and includes all her released PVs, several interviews and live performances. The album charted on the weekly Oricon charts at #111 and sold 1,699 copies so far.

Track listing

References 

2009 albums
Japanese-language albums